is a passenger railway station located in the town of Shimanto, Takaoka District, Kōchi, Japan. It is operated by Shikoku Railway Company (JR Shikoku). It has the station number "G31".

Lines
The station is served by JR Shikoku's Yodo Line, and is 26.5 kilometers from the starting point of the line at Wakai Station.

Layout
Tosa-Shōwa Station consists of a side platform serving a single track which is mounted on an embankment above the level of the town. From the access road, a tunnel goes through the embankment and emerges at a concrete ramp which leads to a flight of steps connecting to the platform on the opposite side of the track. A shelter is provided on the platform for waiting passengers. At the base of the embankment next to the entrance tunnel, a bike shed and limited parking is provided. An unstaffed tourist information centre nearby also serves as a waiting room. The station is not wheelchair accessible.

History
The station opened on 1 March 1974 under the control of Japanese National Railways. After the privatization of JNR on 1 April 1987, control of the station passed to JR Shikoku.

Surrounding area
Shimanto Municipal Showa Junior High School
Shimanto Town Showa Elementary School
Japan National Route 381
Shimanto River

See also
 List of railway stations in Japan

References

External links
Station timetable

Railway stations in Kōchi Prefecture
Yodo Line
Railway stations in Japan opened in 1974
Shimanto, Kōchi (town)